Ella Shields (27 September 1879 – 5 August 1952) was a music hall singer and male-impersonator. Her famous signature song, "Burlington Bertie from Bow", a parody of Vesta Tilley's "Burlington Bertie", written by her manager and first husband, William Hargreaves, was an immediate hit. Though American-born, Shields achieved her greatest success in England.

Background and early life
Ella Shields was born in Baltimore, Maryland, in 1879. Her true surname appears to have been Buscher (sometimes spelled Busher). She was educated in South Bend, Indiana. It is not certain when she adopted the stage name Shields. "Ella" might also have been a stage name.

Career

Shields began her career in 1898, doing a vaudeville song-and-dance act with her sisters. In 1904 a talent scout lured her to London, where she was billed as the "Southern Nightingale". In 1906 she married the songwriter William Joseph Hargreaves in Lambeth, London. In 1910 she appeared at the opening night of the London Palladium. It was at this time that she became a male impersonator. The story goes that one night in 1910 Shields was attending a party at which music-hall performers did their acts for one another. Half of a two-man musical act was out sick, and Shields put on trousers to fill in for him. This impromptu turn in trousers proved to be the turning point of her career and she rarely wore dresses on stage again. 

In 1915 Hargreaves wrote "Burlington Bertie from Bow", a comic ditty about a penniless Londoner who affects the manner of a well-heeled gentleman. It was a parody of an earlier song, simply called "Burlington Bertie", written by Harry B. Norris and made famous by Vesta Tilley. Shields sang the song, dressed up in slightly battered top hat and tails, in the role of Burlington Bertie "himself". She toured the world in this role, including appearances at Baltimore's now-demolished Maryland Theatre in 1924 and 1926. The persona of Bertie haunted the rest of her life and she was known as Bertie as much as Ella. She and Hargreaves had separated in 1916 and they divorced in 1923.

The Depression brought difficult times for many entertainers, and Shields announced her retirement in 1929. She spent time working  at a Macy's jewellery counter in New York. After a period of performing in obscurity, a music-hall reunion show called Thanks for the Memory put "Bertie" back in the spotlight. This show ran throughout England for over three years from 1947 to 1951.
 
Shields worked with many stars over the years, including a very young Julie Andrews in the late 1940s with whom she shared the same bill of a Royal Command Performance. Julie Andrews pays tribute to Shields in her own one-woman show and has recorded Shields' famous song "Burlington Bertie from Bow". It is possible that Julie Andrews used Shields as her role model for "Victor" in the film and stage musical Victor/Victoria.

Death
In August 1952, a septuagenarian Shields performed in northern England. Her death was dramatic. Singing her trademark song, in what would be her final show, instead of the traditional opening line "I'm Burlington Bertie", she began with "I was Burlington Bertie". After finishing the song she collapsed on stage and died three days later, without regaining consciousness, at Lancaster in Lancashire, on 5 August 1952. Her body was cremated at Golders Green Crematorium in London. In the crematorium courtyard she shares a memorial plaque with music hall star Nellie Wallace.

Repertoire
Her repertoire of songs was related to her male-impersonation act, which was often in military attire. They included:

"Burlington Bertie from Bow"
"Baa Lambs"
"I'm Walking 'round the World"
"I Don't Admire the Girl in White (In the Army)"
"Oh! It's a Lovely War"
"Coo-ee"
"Stick to London Town"
"Adeline"
"The King's Navee"
"What a Difference the Navy's Made to Me"
"Why Did You Creep into My Heart?"
"Why Did I Kiss That Girl?"
"I'm Not There At All"
"All the Nice Girls Are in the Ballroom"
"Show Me the Way to Go Home"
"When the Bloom Is on the Heather"
"If You Knew Susie (Like I Know Susie)"
"San Francisco"
"Jolly Good Fellows"
"I'd Do It All Over Again"
"Everybody's Singing"
"Nelly Grey"

References

External links

Burlington Bertie From Baltimore [geoblocked outside USA]
Ella Shields
Ella Shields (1936) - BFI films

1879 births
1952 deaths
American women singers
American drag kings
Music hall performers
Musicians from Baltimore
Vaudeville performers
Golders Green Crematorium
Singers from Maryland